Elachista subalbidella is a moth of the family Elachistidae found in Europe and North America.

Description
The wingspan is .The head is ochreous-yellowish. Forewings are  ochreous yellow, towards costa sometimes fuscous-tinged. Hindwings are dark grey.

Biology
Adults are on wing in June.

The larvae mainly feed on purple moor-grass (Molinia caerulea), but have also been recorded on oatgrass (Arrhenatherum species), tor-grass (Brachypodium pinnatum), false-brome (Brachypodium sylvaticum), bunch grass (Calamagrostis arundinacea), American beak grass (Diarrhena americana), sedges (Carex species), melic grass (Melica species) and meadow-grass (Poa species). They create a long narrow mine in the blade.

Distribution
It is found from Fennoscandia and northern Russia to Italy and Greece and from Ireland to Romania. It is also found in North America (British Columbia, Manitoba, Nova Scotia, Ontario, Quebec, Yukon, Ohio, Pennsylvania and South Dakota).

References

External links
Swedish Moths
Bladmineerders.nl

subalbidella
Leaf miners
Moths described in 1847
Moths of Europe
Moths of North America